Alpha Indi (α Ind, α Indi) is a third magnitude giant star in the constellation Indus, located about 98 light years from the Earth. The stellar classification of this star is K0 III-IV, so it has exhausted the hydrogen at its core and evolved away from the main sequence. It has about double the mass of the Sun and is an estimated billion years old. As a giant star it has expanded to about 12 times the radius of the Sun. The effective temperature of the photosphere is 4,893 K, giving it the characteristic orange hue of a K-type star. It may have two nearby M-type companion stars, which are located at least 2,000 AU from the primary.

In China, this star is called Pe Sze where it also was known as the Persian, a title from the Jesuit missionaries.  The term Pe Sze is from the name of asterism . In Chinese astronomy, consequently, α Indi itself is known as  

References 

Indi, Alpha
196171
101772
7869
Indus (constellation)
K-type giants
Durchmusterung objects